The Cup may refer to:

 The Cup (1999 film), (also Phörpa) a 1999 Tibetan-language comedy film about Tibetan monks and the 1998 World Cup Final
 The Cup (2011 film), a 2011 biographical film about jockey Damien Oliver and the 2002 Melbourne Cup
 The Cup (book), a 2009 non-fiction book about the 2002 Melbourne Cup
 The Cup (TV series), a 2008 British television mockumentary about a junior association football team

See also

 Cup (disambiguation)